SM UB-21 was a German Type UB II submarine or U-boat in the German Imperial Navy during World War I. The U-boat was ordered on 30 April 1915 and launched on 26 September 1915. She was commissioned into the German Imperial Navy on 20 February 1916 as SM UB-21. Surrendered to Britain in accordance with the requirements of the Armistice with Germany, UB-21 was sunk as a target by HMS Terror in the Solent on 30 September 1920; the wreck was sold in 1970 and most had been cleared by 1998, although some remnants survive.

Design
A German Type UB II submarine, UB-21 had a displacement of  when at the surface and  while submerged.

UB-21 was fitted with two  torpedo tubes, four torpedoes, and one  SK L/40 deck gun. She had a complement of twenty-one crew members and two officers and a 45-second dive time.

Summary of raiding history

References

Notes

Citations

Bibliography 

 

German Type UB II submarines
U-boats commissioned in 1916
World War I submarines of Germany
U-boats sunk in 1920
Maritime incidents in 1920
1915 ships
Ships built in Hamburg